Second-seeded Angela Mortimer defeated Dorothy Knode 2–6, 7–5, 10–8 in the final to win the women's singles tennis title at the 1955 French Championships.

Seeds
The seeded players are listed below. Angela Mortimer is the champion; others show the round in which they were eliminated.

  Beverley Fleitz (semifinals)
  Angela Mortimer (champion)
  Darlene Hard (second round)
  Dorothy Knode (finalist)
  Shirley Bloomer (quarterfinals)
  Patricia Ward (third round)
  Erika Vollmer (quarterfinals)
  Ginette Bucaille (quarterfinals)
  Zsuzsi Körmöczy (first round)
  Maud Galtier (first round)
  Beryl Penrose (quarterfinals)
  Hazel Redick-Smith (third round)
  Angela Buxton (third round)
  Toto Zehden (third round)
  Anne-Marie Seghers (second round)
  Lea Pericoli (third round)

Draw

Key
 Q = Qualifier
 WC = Wild card
 LL = Lucky loser
 r = Retired

Finals

Earlier rounds

Section 1

Section 2

Section 3

Section 4

References

External links
   on the French Open website

1955 in tennis
1955
1955 in French women's sport
1955 in French tennis